Northport (population: 188) is a rural municipality in Prince Edward Island, Canada. It is located in Lot 5 township.

Demographics 

References 

Communities in Prince County, Prince Edward Island
Rural municipalities in Prince Edward Island